Quintela de Lampaças is a civil parish in the municipality of Bragança, Portugal. The population in 2011 was 215, in an area of 19.98 km².

References

Parishes of Bragança, Portugal